This Christmas is the  third release overall but second extended play by American country music singer Jessie James Decker.  Released on December 4, 2015, the album was released through Big Yellow Dog Music. The EP includes the original song, "Baby! It's Christmas", released as a promotional single in November 2014. Two other songs have been issues as singles: the title track, in November 2015, and the version of "Baby, It's Cold Outside" featuring Decker's husband, Eric Decker, released in November 2016.

Critic Darryl Sterdan rated the album 2-1/2 stars out of 4, and called it "a surprisingly swell little treat".

Track listing

Chart performance 
This Christmas sold 5,600 copies in its first week of release.

References 

2015 EPs
Jessie James Decker EPs
2015 Christmas albums
Christmas EPs